"Ain't No Mountain High Enough" is a song written by Nickolas Ashford & Valerie Simpson in 1966 for the Tamla label, a division of Motown. The composition was first successful as a 1967 hit single recorded by Marvin Gaye and Tammi Terrell, and became a hit again in 1970 when recorded by former Supremes frontwoman Diana Ross. The song became Ross's first solo number-one hit on the Billboard Hot 100 chart and was nominated for the Grammy Award for Best Female Pop Vocal Performance.

Background 
The song was written by Ashford and Simpson prior to joining Motown. British soul singer Dusty Springfield wanted to record the song but the duo declined, hoping it would give them access to the Detroit-based label. As Valerie Simpson later recalled, "We played that song for her (Springfield) but wouldn't give it to her, because we wanted to hold that back. We felt like that could be our entry to Motown. Nick called it the 'golden egg'." Springfield recorded a similar verse melody in "I'm Gonna Leave You" on Dusty.

The original 1967 version of "Ain't No Mountain High Enough" was a top-20 hit. According to record producers, Terrell was a little nervous and intimidated during the recording sessions because she did not rehearse the lyrics. Terrell recorded her vocals alone with producers Harvey Fuqua and Johnny Bristol, who added Gaye's vocal at a later date. "Ain't No Mountain" peaked at number 19 on the Billboard pop charts, and went to number three on the R&B charts.  Billboards original review of the single stated: "Chalk up another pulsating fast smash for Gaye with his new partner Tammi Terrell. The electricity of the duo combined with the blockbuster rhythm material grooves all the way."

This original version of "Ain't No Mountain", produced by Fuqua and Bristol, was a care-free, danceable, and romantic love song that became the signature duet between Gaye and Terrell. Its success led to a string of more Ashford/Simpson penned duets (including "You're All I Need to Get By", "Ain't Nothing Like the Real Thing", and "Your Precious Love"). In 1999, the Gaye/Terrell version was inducted into the Grammy Hall of Fame.

The Gaye/Terrell version was included in the soundtrack for the 2000 film Remember the Titans as well as the 2014 film Guardians of the Galaxy.

Personnel
 All vocals by Marvin Gaye and Tammi Terrell
 Instrumentation by the Funk Brothers and Detroit Symphony Orchestra

Charts

Certifications

The Supremes and Temptations version
Diana Ross & the Supremes recorded a version of "Ain't No Mountain High Enough", which was more faithful to the Terrell-Gaye original version, as a duet with The Temptations. That song was an album cut from a joint LP released by Motown Records in 1968 on the two superstar groups, titled Diana Ross & the Supremes Join the Temptations.

Diana Ross solo version

In early 1970, after the Top 20 success of her first solo single, "Reach Out and Touch (Somebody's Hand)", Ashford and Simpson had Ross re-record "Ain't No Mountain High Enough". Initially, Ross was apprehensive, but was convinced to make the recording. The remake was a complete reworking of the song, featuring a style similar to gospel with elements of classical music strings and horns, and spoken-word passages from Ross.  The Andantes, Jimmy Beavers, Jo Armstead, Ashford & Simpson and Brenda Evans and Billie Calvin of the Undisputed Truth were used as backing singers, giving the song a soul and gospel vocal element. Ross' version of the song was released on July 19, 1970, as the second and final single from her solo self-titled 1970 debut album by Motown.

Motown chief Berry Gordy did not like the record upon first hearing it. He hated the spoken-word passages and wanted the song to begin with the climactic chorus/bridge. It was not until radio stations nationwide were editing their own versions and adding it to their playlists that Ashford and Simpson were able to convince Gordy to release an edited three-minute version as a single. Ross' version of "Ain't No Mountain High Enough" rose to number one on both the pop and R&B singles charts. Ross received a Grammy nomination for Best Female Pop Vocal Performance. The song is performed in the key of C minor for most of the song, changing to F sharp major towards its conclusion.

In 2017, "Ain't No Mountain High Enough" was remixed by Eric Kupper, StoneBridge and Chris Cox, amongst others, on Motown/UMe. The remix peaked at number one on Billboard'''s Dance Club Songs chart.

Personnel
 Lead vocals by Diana Ross
 Background vocals by Nickolas Ashford, Valerie Simpson, Jo Armstead, the Andantes, Jimmy Beavers, Brenda Evans, and Billie Calvin
 Instrumentation by the Funk Brothers 
 Brass and strings by New York session musicians
Arranged by Paul Riser.

Charts

Weekly charts

Year-end charts

Certifications

Other notable covers
 In 1981, American disco band Inner Life released their version, which reached No. 20 on the U.S. Dance chart. It is particularly noted for the 10 minute Larry Levan remix.
 In 1981, Boys Town Gang recorded a medley of the song "Remember Me" together with "Ain't No Mountain High Enough". The single was a No. 5 U.S. Dance hit and a top 20 hit in Belgium and the Netherlands.
 In 1991, Australian singer Jimmy Barnes released an album of soul remakes titled Soul Deep'', including his rock version of "Ain't No Mountain High Enough". His version reached No. 28 in Australia in 1992.
 In 2003 and 2004 respectively, Swedish girl group Play recorded their version for their debut album and second album; albeit with different lead singers.
 In 2018, a remix of the Diana Ross version reached No. 1 on the US Dance Club Songs chart.

 In 2023, American  R&B girl group Brownstone released a "live" cover version from their upcoming Live Covers Album.

See also
List of number-one dance singles of 2018 (U.S.)

References

External links 
 Ain't No Mountain High Enough Lyrics
  (radio edit)
  (album version)

1966 songs
1967 singles
1970 singles
Billboard Hot 100 number-one singles
Cashbox number-one singles
Diana Ross songs
Grammy Hall of Fame Award recipients
Jimmy Barnes songs
Male–female vocal duets
Marvin Gaye songs
Michael McDonald (musician) songs
Motown singles
Song recordings produced by Ashford & Simpson
Song recordings produced by Harvey Fuqua
Song recordings produced by Johnny Bristol
Songs about mountains
Songs written by Nickolas Ashford
Songs written by Valerie Simpson
Tamla Records singles
Tammi Terrell songs